Samba da Vida is a 1937 Brazilian film produced by Adhemar Gonzaga and directed by Luiz de Barros. The film is based on the play Frederico Segundo, by Eurico Silva.

Cast

References

External links 
Samba da Vida on IMDb

1937 films
1930s Portuguese-language films
Cinédia films
Brazilian comedy films
Brazilian black-and-white films
Films directed by Luiz de Barros
1937 comedy films